In organic chemistry, an aryl halide (also known as haloarene) is an aromatic compound in which one or more hydrogen atoms, directly bonded to an aromatic ring are replaced by a halide.  The haloarene are different from haloalkanes because they exhibit many differences in methods of preparation and properties.  The most important members are the aryl chlorides, but the class of compounds is so broad that there are many derivatives and applications.

Preparation
The two main preparatory routes to aryl halides are direct halogenation and via diazonium salts.

Direct halogenation
In the Friedel-Crafts halogenation, Lewis acids serve as catalysts. Many metal chlorides are used, examples include iron(III) chloride or aluminium chloride. The most important aryl halide, chlorobenzene is produced by this route. Monochlorination of benzene is always accompanied by formation of the dichlorobenzene derivatives.

Arenes with electron donating groups react with halogens even in the absence of Lewis acids. For example, phenols and anilines react quickly with chlorine and bromine water to give multiple halogenated products. The decolouration of bromine water by electron-rich arenes is used in the bromine test.

Direct halogenation of arenes are possible in the presence of light or at high temperature.  For alkylbenzene derivatives, the alkyl positions tend to be halogenated first in the free radical halogenation. To halogenate the ring, Lewis acids are required, and light should be excluded to avoid the competing reaction.

Sandmeyer, Balz-Schiemann and Gattermann reactions
The second main route is the Sandmeyer reaction. Anilines (aryl amines) are converted to their diazonium salts using nitrous acid. For example, copper(I) chloride converts diazonium salts to the aryl chloride. Nitrogen gas is the leaving group, which makes this reaction very favorable. The similar Schiemann reaction uses the tetrafluoroborate anion as the fluoride donor. Gatterman reaction can also be used to convert diazonium salt to chlorobenzene or bromobenzene by using copper powder instead of copper chloride or copper bromide. But this must be done in the presence of HCl and HBr respectively.

Aryl halides in nature
Aryl halides occur widely in nature, most commonly produced by marine organisms that utilize the chloride and bromide in ocean waters. Chlorinated and brominated aromatic compounds are also numerous, e.g. derivatives of tyrosine, tryptophan, and various pyrrole derivatives. Some of these naturally occurring aryl halides exhibit useful medicinal properties.

Structural trends
The C-X distances for aryl halides follow the expected trend. These distances for fluorobenzene, chlorobenzene, bromobenzene, and methyl 4-iodobenzoate are 135.6(4), 173.90(23), 189.8(1), and 209.9 pm, respectively.

Reactions

Substitution
Unlike typical alkyl halides, aryl halides typically do not participate in conventional substitution reactions. Aryl halides with electron-withdrawing groups in the ortho and para positions, can undergo SNAr reactions. For example, 2,4-dinitrochlorobenzene reacts in basic solution to give a phenol:

Unlike in most other substitution reactions, fluoride is the best leaving group, and iodide the worst.  A 2018 paper indicates that this situation may actually be rather common, occurring in systems that were previously assumed to proceed via SNAr mechanisms.

Benzyne
Aryl halides often react via the intermediacy of benzynes. Chlorobenzene and sodium amide react in liquid ammonia to give aniline by this pathway.

Organometallic reagent formation
Aryl halides react with metals, generally lithium or magnesium, to give more organometallic derivatives that function as sources of aryl anions. By the metal-halogen exchange reaction, aryl halides are converted to aryl lithium compounds.  Illustrative is the preparation of phenyl lithium from bromobenzene using butyl lithium (BuLi):
 C6H5Br + BuLi → C6H5Li  +  BuBr

Direct formation of Grignard reagents, by adding the magnesium to the aryl halide in an ethereal solution, works well if the aromatic ring is not significantly deactivated by electron-withdrawing groups.

Other reactions
The halides can be displaced by strong nucleophiles via reactions involving radical anions. Alternatively aryl halides, especially the bromides and iodides, undergo oxidative addition, and thus are subject to Buchwald–Hartwig amination-type reactions.

Chlorobenzene was once the precursor to phenol, which is now made by oxidation of cumene. At high temperatures, aryl groups react with ammonia to give anilines.

Biodegradation 
Rhodococcus phenolicus is a bacterium that degrade dichlorobenzene as sole carbon sources.

Applications
The aryl halides produced on the largest scale are chlorobenzene and the isomers of dichlorobenzene. One major but discontinued application was the use of chlorobenzene as a solvent for dispersing the herbicide Lasso. Overall, production of aryl chlorides (also naphthyl derivatives) has been declining since the 1980s, in part due to environmental concerns. Triphenylphosphine is produced from chlorobenzene:
3 C6H5Cl + PCl3 + 6 Na → P(C6H5)3 + 6 NaCl

Aryl bromides are widely used as fire-retardants. The most prominent member is tetrabromobisphenol-A, which is prepared by direct bromination of the diphenol.

References

Aromatic compounds
Organohalides